Ora 7 Jon also known as The 7 is a 2023 Bangladeshi action-war film based on the 1971 Liberation war between Pakistan (Than West Pakistan) and Bangladesh (Than East Pakistan). The Movie is directed and written by Khijir Hayat Khan. The Movie had officially released at March 3, 2023

Plot 
The story follows 7 brave freedom fighters heroism journey during the 1971 Liberation war. As they have a mission to rescue a Bangladeshi doctor in the battleground of Victory.

Cast 

 Khijir Hayat Khan as Major Luthfur
 Zakia Bari Momo as Aporna
 Nazia Haque orsha as Aporazita
 Shahriar Ferdous Sazeed as Sergent Muktadir
 Hamidur Rahman as Major Shahriar
 Imtiaz Borshon as Solaiman Kazi
 Khalid Manhub Turjo as Nazrul 
 Joy raj as Awal Chaiman
 Amjad hossain as Amjad
 Intekhab Dinar as Doctor saab
 Nafis Ahmed
 Shiba Shamu
 Azam Khan

Production

development 
In March 2021 while Khijir Hayat khan was found positive in COVID-19. He had a idea of making a new adaptation on the 1971 Bangladeshi Liberation war, as soon as he got recovered he started to work on the film. Khijir Hayat did both direction, writing & screenplay for the movie.

Filming 
The Movie started filming in September 27, 2021 at Jayantapur,Sylhet. The Whole Movie was done in Sylhet. Not Only did KHK Productions team worked on the project but director Khijir Hayat also used the village peoples and hired them to do mirror role, making him to help the movie more quickly and better. All Costumes of the movie were designed by Eimon Khandakar and Makeup were done by Ratan Sarkar

Music 
The Songs and music for Ora 7 Jon were done by Nazmul Abedin and Rajib Hossain

Release 
The Movie Had a official theaters release at March 3, 2023 in 26 Cinema halls over the whole country

References 

 

2023 action films
2020s Bengali-language films
Bengali-language Bangladeshi films
Bangladeshi war drama films
Films shot in Sylhet Division
Films based on the Bangladesh Liberation War